VMI may refer to:

Science and technology
 Virtual mobile infrastructure, hosting a nominally mobile operating system in a data center or cloud
 Velocity Map Imaging, a technique in photofragment-ion imaging in chemical physics
 Virtual machine image, an exact snapshot of a computer disk in a virtual machine

Organizations
 State Tax Inspectorate, a Lithuanian tax authority
 Virginia Military Institute, America's oldest state-supported and only all-military college, located in Lexington, Virginia
 United States v. Virginia ("the VMI decision"), a 1996 US Supreme Court case which struck down VMI's male-only admission policy
 Virginia Mason Institute, part of the Virginia Mason Medical Center hospital system

Other uses
 Vendor-managed inventory, where a product supplier maintains an inventory of material, typically at the buyer's location